The Sailor Takes a Wife is a 1946 American romantic comedy film directed by Richard Whorf and starring Robert Walker and June Allyson.

Plot
During World War II, a sailor in New York City who is about to be shipped out to Europe marries a woman he has just met. Then he unexpectedly receives a medical discharge.

Cast
Robert Walker as John Hill
June Allyson as Mary Hill
Hume Cronyn as Freddie Potts
Audrey Totter as Lisa Borescu
Eddie "Rochester" Anderson as Harry
Reginald Owen as Mr. Amboy
Gerald Oliver Smith as Gerald

Reception
According to MGM records, the film earned $2,269,000 in the US and Canada and $290,000 elsewhere, making a profit of $683,000.

References

External links

Review of film at Variety

1946 romantic comedy films
1946 films
American romantic comedy films
American black-and-white films
American films based on plays
Films directed by Richard Whorf
Films set in New York City
Films set on the home front during World War II
Metro-Goldwyn-Mayer films
1940s English-language films
1940s American films